Laura Louise "Lakey" Peterson (born September 30, 1994) is an American professional surfer. She has been ranked as high as #1 by the World Surf League, the highest professional level of women's surfing, and #6 on the ASP Women's World Ranking. In 2009, Peterson landed the first-ever aerial in NSSA women's competition history and won the title.

Background 
In 2000, when Peterson was just five years old, her parents, David and Sue, rounded up their youngest child and her two older siblings —Whitney, then 13, and Parker, 10 — and set out on a year-long, around-the-world adventure. It was during this trip that Peterson learned to surf. For three months, the Petersons set up shop in Manly Beach, Australia, where their littlest member instantly earned the nickname "Lakey Legend" from the locals for effortlessly catching wave after wave on her boogie board. However, once returning home to the US, Peterson did not continue surfing. It was at the age of 12 when she began surfing again. At the age of 16, Peterson was surfing on the ASP World Qualifying Series. She qualified for the ASP Women's World Championship Tour that year and began her rookie year on tour in the 2012 season, at age 17. Peterson is of Christian faith.

Personal life
Peterson dated Australian surfer Thomas Allen for a number of years before they got married. On January 21, 2018, the couple got engaged, near Peterson's hometown in California, with close friends and fellow surfers near by. They were married on February 2, 2019.

On February 14, 2010, Peterson started her YouTube channel dedicated to sharing her life, travel, and surfing. She began uploading videos in May 2019 with a first video in vlog format covering life in Bali surrounding a surfing competition. In addition to publishing her own content on YouTube, Peterson is a fan of the videos Hailey Baldwin shares on YouTube.

Career

2018 World Championship Tour
For the 2018 World Surf League Championship Tour Peterson ranked second overall behind Australian surfer Stephanie Gilmore. Peterson was the highest ranked female American surfer for the year's world championship tour.

2019 World Championship Tour
In the 2019 World Surf league Championship Tour, Peterson ranked third overall behind the Carissa Moore and Caroline Marks.

2020 Summer Olympics

Peterson finished third out of female competitors for the United States at the qualifying event for the 2020 Summer Olympics, the 2019 World Surf League Championship Tour, and only the top two finishers for the country qualified directly for the US Olympic Team. Her third place overall finish behind two female American surfers qualified her indirectly for the US Olympic Surf Team as an alternate.

Highlights
A few of Peterson's career highlights thus far include:

Sponsors 
Peterson currently is sponsored by sisstrevolution, Blenders Eyewear Channel Islands, and Homegrown Surf Shop.  She is featured in a Toyota Tacoma commercial.

In March 2020, Peterson became one of six women athletes to feature on the limited edition packaging of Clif Bars available throughout 2020.

Filmography

External links
 Facebook 
 Official Site

References 

1994 births
Living people
American surfers
American female surfers
World Surf League surfers
Sportspeople from Santa Barbara, California
21st-century American women